Kadjebi is a small town and is the capital of Kadjebi district, a district in the Oti Region of Ghana.

Geography

Location
Kadjebi is located in the middle part of the Oti Region and not far from the Ghana-Togo international border.

References

External links and sources
 Kadjebi Akan Association
 Kadjebi District on GhanaDistricts.com

Further reading
 La petite ville, Un milieu adapté aux paradoxes de l’Afrique de l’Ouest 

Populated places in the Oti Region